Hillsboro may refer to several places:

Places

United States 
Hillsboro, Alabama, in Lawrence County

Hillsboro, Georgia, in Jasper County
Hillsboro, Illinois
Hillsboro, Indiana, in Fountain County
Hillsboro, Henry County, Indiana, a small village
Hillsboro, Iowa
Hillsboro, Kansas
Hillsboro, Kentucky, in Fleming County
Hillsboro, Maryland
Hillsboro, Mississippi, in Scott County
Hillsboro, Missouri
Hillsboro, New Mexico
Hillsboro, North Dakota
Hillsboro, Ohio
Hillsboro, Oregon
Hillsboro, Pennsylvania, in Somerset County
Hillsboro, Tennessee
Hillsboro, Texas
Hillsboro, King and Queen County, Virginia
Hillsboro, Loudoun County, Virginia
Hillsboro, West Virginia
Hillsboro (town), Wisconsin
Hillsboro, Wisconsin, a city in the town

Fictional 
Hillsboro, Tennessee, the setting of the 1955 play Inherit the Wind

See also
Hillsboro Historic District (disambiguation)
Hillsborough (disambiguation)